In probability theory, the family of complex normal distributions, denoted  or , characterizes complex random variables whose real and imaginary parts are jointly normal. The complex normal family has three parameters: location parameter μ, covariance matrix , and the relation matrix .

This case is used extensively in signal processing, where it is sometimes referred to as just complex normal in the literature.

Definitions

Complex standard normal random variable
The standard complex normal random variable or standard complex Gaussian random variable is a complex random variable  whose real and imaginary parts are independent normally distributed random variables with mean zero and variance . Formally,

where  denotes that  is a standard complex normal random variable.

Complex normal random variable
Then the complex random variable  is called complex normal random variable or complex Gaussian random variable.

Complex standard normal random vector
A n-dimensional complex random vector  is a complex standard normal random vector or complex standard Gaussian random vector if its components are independent and all of them are standard complex normal random variables as defined above.
That  is a standard complex normal random vector is denoted .

Complex normal random vector
Then we say that the complex random vector
 
is a complex normal random vector or a complex Gaussian random vector.

Mean, covariance, and relation
The complex Gaussian distribution can be described with 3 parameters:
 

Here the location parameter  is a n-dimensional complex vector; the covariance matrix  is Hermitian and non-negative definite; and, the relation matrix or pseudo-covariance matrix  is symmetric.
 

Relationships between covariance matrices

 
and conversely

Density function
The probability density function for complex normal distribution can be computed as

 

Characteristic function
The characteristic function of complex normal distribution is given by
 
where the argument  is an n-dimensional complex vector.

Properties
 If  is a complex normal n-vector,  an m×n matrix, and  a constant m-vector, then the linear transform  will be distributed also complex-normally:
 

 If  is a complex normal n-vector, then
 

 Central limit theorem. If  are independent and identically distributed complex random variables, then
 

 The modulus of a complex normal random variable follows a Hoyt distribution.

Circularly-symmetric central case

Definition

Central normal complex random vectors that are circularly symmetric are of particular interest because they are fully specified by the covariance matrix .

This is usually denoted

Distribution of real and imaginary parts
If  is circularly-symmetric (central) complex normal, then the vector  is multivariate normal with covariance structure
 

Probability density function
For nonsingular covariance matrix , its distribution can also be simplified as
 .

Therefore, if the non-zero mean  and covariance matrix  are unknown, a suitable log likelihood function for a single observation vector  would be
 

Thus, the standard complex normal distribution has density

Properties
The above expression demonstrates why the case ,  is called “circularly-symmetric”. The density function depends only on the magnitude of  but not on its argument.

 
has the generalized chi-squared distribution and the random matrix
 
has the complex Wishart distribution with  degrees of freedom. This distribution can be described by density function
 

See also
 Complex normal ratio distribution
 Directional statistics#Distribution of the mean (polar form)
 Normal distribution
 Multivariate normal distribution (a complex normal distribution is a bivariate normal distribution)
 Generalized chi-squared distribution
 Wishart distribution
 Complex random variable

References

Further reading

 
 

 Wollschlaeger, Daniel. "ShotGroups." Hoyt. RDocumentation, n.d. Web. https://www.rdocumentation.org/packages/shotGroups/versions/0.7.1/topics/Hoyt.
 Gallager, Robert G (2008). "Circularly-Symmetric Gaussian Random Vectors." (n.d.): n. pag. Pre-print. Web. 9 http://www.rle.mit.edu/rgallager/documents/CircSymGauss.pdf.

Continuous distributions
Multivariate continuous distributions
Complex distributions